Yegor Alekseyevich Pogostnov (born 1 March 2004) is a Russian footballer who plays as a centre-back for Lokomotiv Moscow.

Club career
He made his debut in the Russian Premier League for Lokomotiv Moscow on 6 November 2022 in a game against Ural Yekaterinburg.

Career statistics

References

External links
 
 
 
 

Living people
2004 births
People from Alexandrovsky District, Vladimir Oblast
Sportspeople from Vladimir Oblast
Russian footballers
Association football defenders
Russia youth international footballers
Russian Second League players
Russian Premier League players
FC Lokomotiv Moscow players